Malcolm Keith Stephens (17 February 1930 – 6 February 2005) was an English professional footballer who played as an inside forward in the Football League for Brighton & Hove Albion, Rotherham United and Doncaster Rovers.

Life and career
Stephens was born in 1930 in Doncaster, which was then in the West Riding of Yorkshire. Described as a "stocky little inside forward", he joined Brighton & Hove Albion straight from his Royal Navy service, and scored at a rate of a goal every other game. However, in competition with Albert Mundy and Denis Foreman, he was unable to establish himself as a first-team regular, and moved on to Rotherham United and then Doncaster Rovers. He died in Plymouth, Devon, in 2005 at the age of 74.

References

1930 births
2005 deaths
Footballers from Doncaster
English footballers
Association football inside forwards
Brighton & Hove Albion F.C. players
Rotherham United F.C. players
Doncaster Rovers F.C. players
English Football League players